East Midlands Franchise may refer to:

East Midlands Trains that operated the franchise from November 2007 until August 2019
East Midlands Railway that operates the franchise since August 2019